The đàn tứ (chữ Nôm: 彈四) (tứ meaning "four" in Sino-Vietnamese, referring to the instrument's number of strings), also called đàn đoản (đoản meaning "short," referring to the instrument's neck), is a traditional Vietnamese stringed musical instrument, this is short-necked, round-bodied lute derived from the Chinese yueqin, with four strings in double courses. It is little used today.

A different instrument with the same name, which is similar to the Chinese zhongruan, is used in Vietnam's tradition of nhạc dân tộc cải biên. In around the 1960s, musicians in Vietnam's conservatories improved the đàn tứ's ability to play Western-style music by creating a rectangular body with longer strings and fretting designed for the Western diatonic scale. This newer instrument has become much more popular than the traditional version.

References

Lute family instruments
String instruments
Vietnamese musical instruments